Ravidas Mehrotra (born 21 April 1955) is an Indian politician and former cabinet minister in the Government of Uttar Pradesh led by Akhilesh Yadav. He was member of Tenth and Sixteenth Legislative Assembly of Uttar Pradesh.

References

1955 births
Living people
Politicians from Lucknow
Uttar Pradesh MLAs 2022–2027